The 1975–76 snooker season was a series of snooker tournaments played between August 1975 and May 1976. The following table outlines the results for the ranking and the invitational events.


Calendar

Order of Merit 

This Order of Merit was published after the 1975 World Snooker Championship, and was used for seeding purposes. It used the same criteria as the first official rankings list for the next season.

Notes

References

External links 
 

1975
Season 1976
Season 1975